The 2008 Milwaukee Brewers season opened with optimism as the team attempted to build on the success of the 2007 season – their first winning season since 1992.

With 12 games remaining in the regular season, manager Ned Yost was fired and replaced with bench coach Dale Sveum.  Under Sveum, the team completed the regular season 7-5, finishing second place in the National League Central with a record of 90-72 and winning the NL Wild Card.  With the Wild Card berth, the team clinched its first playoff berth in 26 years. The season was highlighted by the midseason trade for ace pitcher CC Sabathia, who posted a 1.65 ERA in 130.2 innings pitched and won all but two starts. 

In the NLDS, the Brewers were defeated 3-1 by the Philadelphia Phillies, who went on to win the World Series.

Regular season
The Brewers played 20 extra inning games, the most of any MLB team in 2008.

Season standings

Record vs. opponents

Roster

Player stats

Note: Team leaders in batting and pitching are in bold.

Batting

Starters by position
Note: Pos = Position; G = Games played; AB = At bats; H = Hits; Avg. = Batting average; HR = Home runs; RBI = Runs batted in

Other batters
Note: G = Games played; AB = At bats; H = Hits; Avg. = Batting average; HR = Home runs; RBI = Runs batted in

Pitching

Starting pitchers
Note: G = Games pitched; IP = Innings pitched; W = Wins; L = Losses; ERA = Earned run average; SO = Strikeouts

Other pitchers
Note: G = Games pitched; IP = Innings pitched; W = Wins; L = Losses; ERA = Earned run average; SO = Strikeouts

Relief pitchers
Note: G = Games pitched; W = Wins; L = Losses; SV = Saves; ERA = Earned run average; SO = Strikeouts

Game log

|- align="center" bgcolor="bbffbb"
| 1 || March 31 || @ Cubs || 4 – 3  (10) || Gagné (1-0) || Howry (0-1) ||Riske (1) || 41,089 || 1-0
|-

|- align="center" bgcolor="bbffbb"
| 2 || April 2 || @ Cubs || 8 – 2 || Suppan (1-0) || Lilly (0-1) || || 39,468 || 2-0
|- align="center" bgcolor="ffbbbb"
| 3 || April 3 || @ Cubs || 6 – 3 || Dempster (1-0) || Bush (0-1) || Wood (1) || 37,973 || 2-1
|- align="center" bgcolor="bbffbb"
| 4 || April 4 || Giants || 13 – 4 || Villanueva (1-0) || Sánchez (0-1) || Torres (1) || 45,212 || 3-1
|- align="center" bgcolor="bbffbb"
| 5 || April 5 || Giants || 5 – 4 || Parra (1-0) || Correia (0-1) || Gagné (1) || 30,574 || 4-1
|- align="center" bgcolor="bbffbb"
| 6 || April 6 || Giants || 7 – 0 || Sheets (1-0) || Zito (0-1) || || 44,014 || 5-1
|- align="center" bgcolor="bbffbb"
| 7 || April 8 || Reds || 3 – 2 (10) || Torres (1-0) || Weathers (0-1) || || 27,717 || 6-1
|- align="center" bgcolor="ffbbbb"
| 8 || April 9 || Reds || 12 – 4 || Fogg (1-1) || Bush (0-2) || || 31,313 || 6-2
|- align="center" bgcolor="ffbbbb"
| 9 || April 10 || Reds || 4 – 1 || Harang (1-1) || Villanueva (1-1) || Cordero (2) || 25,023 || 6-3
|- align="center" bgcolor="ffbbbb"
| 10 || April 11 || @ Mets || 4 – 2 || Figueroa (1-0) || Parra (1-1) || Wagner (1) || 46,214 || 6-4
|- align="center" bgcolor="bbffbb"
| 11 || April 12 || @ Mets || 5 – 3 || Sheets (2-0) || Santana (1-2) || Gagné (2)|| 54,701 || 7-4
|- align="center" bgcolor="bbffbb"
| 12 || April 13 || @ Mets || 9 – 7 || Torres (2-0)|| Sosa (1-1)|| Gagné (3) || 52,794 || 8-4
|- align="center" bgcolor="ffbbbb"
| 13 || April 15 || @ Cardinals || 6 – 1 || Looper (3-0) || Bush (0-3) || || 39,438|| 8-5
|- align="center" bgcolor="ffbbbb"
| 14 || April 16 || @ Cardinals || 5 – 4 || Wainwright (2-1) || Villanueva (1-2) || Isringhausen (6) || 40,712 || 8-6
|- align="center" bgcolor="bbffbb"
| 15 || April 17 || @ Cardinals || 5 – 3 (10) || Shouse (1-0) || Thompson (1-1) || Gagné (4) || 36,850 || 9-6
|- align="center" bgcolor="bbffbb"
| 16 || April 18 || @ Reds || 5 – 2 || Sheets (3-0) || Arroyo (0-2) || Gagné (5) || 32,629 || 10-6
|- align="center" bgcolor="bbffbb"
| 17 || April 19 || @ Reds || 5 – 3 (10) || Mota (1-0) || Weathers (0-2) || Gagné (6) || 26,410 || 11-6
|- align="center" bgcolor="ffbbbb"
| 18 || April 20 || @ Reds || 4 – 3 (10) || Burton (1-1) || Gagné (1-1) || || 26,902 || 11-7
|- align="center" bgcolor="ffbbbb"
| 19 || April 21 || Cardinals || 4 – 3 ||Franklin (1-1) || Turnbow(0-1) || Isringhausen (7) ||31,240 || 11-8
|- align="center" bgcolor="bbffbb"
| 20 || April 22 || Cardinals || 9 – 8  (12) ||McClung(1-0) ||Isringhausen (1-1) || ||23,478 || 12-8
|- align="center" bgcolor="bbffbb"
| 21 || April 23 || Phillies || 5 – 4 ||Stetter (1-0) ||Hamels (2-3)||Turnbow (1)||30,548 || 13-8
|- align="center" bgcolor="ffbbbb"
| 22 || April 24 || Phillies || 3 – 1 ||Gordon (1-2) ||Riske(0-1)||Lidge (5) ||23,905 ||13-9
|- align="center" bgcolor="ffbbbb"
| 23 || April 25 || Marlins || 3 – 0 || Gregg (3-0) || Mota (1-1) || || 40,088 || 13-10
|- align="center" bgcolor="bbffbb"
| 24 || April 26 || Marlins || 4 – 3 || Torres (3-0) ||Pinto (1-1) ||Gagné (7) || 44,169 ||14-10
|- align="center" bgcolor="ffbbbb"
| 25 || April 27 || Marlins || 3 – 2 || Lindstrom (1-0) ||McClung (1-1)||Gregg (4)''||41,656|| 14-11
|- align="center" bgcolor="bbffbb"
| 26 || April 29 || @ Cubs || 10 – 7 ||Sheets (4-0) ||Marquis (1-1)|| Gagné (8)||39,543 || 15-11
|- align="center" bgcolor="ffbbbb"
| 27 || April 30 || @ Cubs || 19 – 5 || Dempster (4-0) || Suppan (1-1) || || 39,908 || 15-12
|-

|- align="center" bgcolor="bbffbb"
| 28 || May 1 || @ Cubs || 4 – 3 || Shouse (2-0) || Wood (2-1) || Gagné (9) || 40, 849 || 16-12
|- align="center" bgcolor="ffbbbb"
| 29 || May 2 || @ Astros || 7 – 4 || Oswalt (3-3) || Villanueva (1-3) || Valverde (6) || 39,715 || 16-13
|- align="center" bgcolor="ffbbbb"
| 30 || May 3 || @ Astros || 6 – 2 ||  Backe (2-3)  || Parra (1-2) || || 35,002 || 16-14
|- align="center" bgcolor="ffbbbb"
| 31 || May 4 || @ Astros || 8 – 6 || Byrdak (1-0) || Stetter (1-1) ||  || 38,301 || 16-15
|- align="center" bgcolor="ffbbbb"
| 32 || May 6 || @ Marlins || 3 – 0 || Olsen (3-0) || Suppan (1-2)|| Gregg (6) || 10,113 || 16-16
|- align="center" bgcolor="ffbbbb"
| 33 || May 7 || @ Marlins || 6 – 2 || Badenhop (1-2) || Bush (0-4)|| || 10,405 || 16-17
|- align="center" bgcolor="ffbbbb"
| 34 || May 8 || @ Marlins || 7 – 2 || Kensing (1-0) || Villanueva (1-4)|| || 12,321 || 16-18
|- align="center" bgcolor="bbffbb"
| 35 || May 9 || Cardinals || 4 – 3 || Shouse (3-0) || Isringhausen (1-4) || || 42,705 || 17-18
|- align="center" bgcolor="ffbbbb"
| 36 || May 10 || Cardinals || 5 – 3 || Springer (1-0) || Gagné (1-2) || Franklin (2) || 43,382 || 17-19
|- align="center" bgcolor="bbffbb"
| 37 || May 11 || Cardinals || 5 – 3 || Suppan (2-2) || Looper (5-2) || Shouse (1) || 41,197 || 18-19
|- align="center" bgcolor="bbffbb"
| 38 || May 12 || Cardinals || 8 – 3 || Bush (1-4)  || Wainwright (3-2) || Mota (1) ||25,757 || 19-19
|- align="center" bgcolor="bbffbb"
| 39 || May 13 || Dodgers || 5 – 3 || Villanueva (2-4)  || Penny (5-4) ||Gagné (10) ||26,465 ||20-19
|- align="center" bgcolor="ffbbbb"
| 40 || May 14 || Dodgers || 6 – 4 || Broxton (2-1) || Mota (1-2) || Saito (6) || 27,562 ||20-20
|- align="center" bgcolor="ffbbbb"
| 41 || May 15 || Dodgers || 7 – 2 || Billingsley (3-5) || Sheets (4-1) || ||30,444 ||20-21
|- align="center" bgcolor="ffbbbb"
| 42 || May 17 || @ Red Sox || 5 – 3 || Matsuzaka (7-0) || Suppan (2-3) || ||37,409 || 20-22
|- align="center" bgcolor="ffbbbb"
| 43 || May 17 || @ Red Sox || 7 – 6 || Hansen (1-2) || Torres (3-1) || Timlin (1) ||37,847  ||20-23
|- align="center" bgcolor="ffbbbb"
| 44 || May 18 || @ Red Sox || 11 – 7 || Beckett (5-3) || Villanueva (2-5) || ||37, 204 ||20-24
|- align="center" bgcolor="bbffbb"
| 45 || May 20 || @ Pirates || 7 – 2 || Parra (2-2) || Maholm (2-5)|| || 11,761 ||  21-24
|- align="center" bgcolor="bbffbb"
| 46 || May 21 || @ Pirates || 4 – 1 || Sheets (5-1) || Snell (2-3)|| || 8,805 ||22-24
|- align="center" bgcolor="ffbbbb"
| 47 || May 22 || @ Pirates || 8 – 4 || Gorzelanny (4-4) || Bush (1-5)|| || 12,887 || 22-25
|- align="center" bgcolor="FFBBBB"
| 48 || May 23 || @ Nationals || 5 – 1 || Sanches (1-0) || Suppan (2-4)|| || 28,007 || 22-26
|- align="center" bgcolor="bbffbb"
| 49 || May 24 || @ Nationals || 5 – 2 || McClung (2-1) || Lannan (4-5) || Torres (2) || 30,029 || 23-26
|- align="center" bgcolor="ffbbbb"
| 50 || May 25 || @ Nationals || 7 – 6 || Rauch (3-1) || Mota (1-3) || || 35,567 || 23-27
|- align="center" bgcolor="bbffbb"
| 51 || May 26 || @ Nationals || 4 – 3 || Villanueva (3-5) || Rivera (3-2) ||Torres (3)||28,552||24-27
|- align="center" bgcolor="bbffbb"
| 52 || May 27 || Braves || 3 – 2 || Torres (4-1) || Bennett (0-3) || || 28,872 || 25-27
|- align="center" bgcolor="bbffbb"
| 53 || May 28 || Braves || 1 – 0 || Suppan (3-4) || Reyes (2-3) || Torres (4) || 31,612 || 26-27
|- align="center" bgcolor="ffbbbb"
| 54 || May 29 || Braves || 8 – 1 || Campillo (2-0) || McClung (2-2) || || 33,334 || 26-28
|- align="center" bgcolor="bbffbb"
| 55 || May 30 || Astros || 5 – 1 || Parra (3-2)  || Backe 4-6 || || 32,039 ||27-28
|- align="center" bgcolor="bbffbb"
| 56 || May 31 || Astros || 4 – 1 || Sheets (6-1) || Moehler  (2-2)|| Torres (5) || 42,913 || 28-28
|-

|- align="center" bgcolor="bbffbb"
| 57 || June 1 || Astros || 10 – 1 || Bush (2-5) || Chacón (2-1) || || 44,613 || 29-28
|- align="center" bgcolor="bbffbb"
| 58 || June 2 || D-backs || 4 – 3 || Mota (2-3) || Slaten (0-2) || Torres (6) ||27,562|| 30-28
|- align="center" bgcolor="bbffbb"
| 59 || June 3 || D-backs || 7 – 1 || McClung (3-2) || Johnson (4-2) || Shouse (2) || 29,478 || 31-28
|- align="center" bgcolor="bbffbb"
| 60 || June 4 || D-backs || 10 – 1 || Parra (4-2) || Owings (6-4) || ||27,539 || 32-28
|- align="center" bgcolor="FFBBBB"
| 61 || June 6 || @ Rockies || 6 – 4 || Corpas (1-3) || Mota (2-4) || Fuentes (9) ||30,558 || 32-29
|- align="center" bgcolor="FFBBBB"
| 62 || June 7 || @ Rockies || 7 – 2 || Reynolds (1-3) || Bush (2-6) || ||37,283 ||32-30
|- align="center" bgcolor="bbffbb"
| 63 || June 8 || @ Rockies || 3 – 2 || Suppan (4-4) || Francis (2-6) || Torres (7) ||32,256 ||33-30
|- align="center" bgcolor="ffbbbb"
| 64 || June 10 || @ Astros || 6 – 1 || Oswalt (5-6) || McClung (3-3) || ||35,058 ||33-31
|- align="center" bgcolor="bbffbb"
| 65 || June 11 || @ Astros || 10 – 6 || Parra (5-2) || Backe (4-8) || ||33,806 ||34-31
|- align="center" bgcolor="bbffbb"
| 66 || June 12 || @ Astros || 9 – 6 || Sheets (7-1) || Moehler (3-3)|| ||35,709 ||35-31
|- align="center" bgcolor="ffbbbb"
| 67 || June 13 || Twins || 10 – 2 || Slowey (3-6) || Bush (2-7) || || 38,586 ||35-32
|- align="center" bgcolor="ffbbbb"
| 68 || June 14 || Twins || 9 – 4 || Bass (3-2) || Tavárez (0-1) || ||43,812 || 35-33
|- align="center" bgcolor="bbffbb"
| 69 || June 15 || Twins || 4 – 2 || McClung (4-3) || Baker (2-2) || Torres (8) ||41,693 || 36-33
|- align="center" bgcolor="bbffbb"
| 70 || June 17 || Blue Jays || 7 – 0 || Parra (6-2) || McGowan (5-5)|| || 37,065 || 37-33
|- align="center" bgcolor="bbffbb"
| 71 || June 18 || Blue Jays ||5 – 4 || Sheets (8-1) || Marcum (5-4) || ||34,442 ||38-33
|- align="center" bgcolor="bbffbb"
| 72 || June 19 || Blue Jays ||8 – 7 || Bush (3-7) || Burnett (6-7) || Torres (10) || 35,173 || 39-33
|- align="center" bgcolor="ffbbbb"
| 73 || June 20 || Orioles || 8 – 5 || Cormier (1-2) || Suppan (4-5) || Sherrill (25) || 36,526 || 39-34
|- align="center" bgcolor="bbffbb"
| 74 || June 21 || Orioles || 3 – 2 || McClung (5-3) || Cabrera (5-3) || Torres (11) || 42,521 || 40-34
|- align="center" bgcolor="bbffbb"
| 75 || June 22 || Orioles || 7 – 3 || Parra (7-2) || Olson (5-3) ||  Torres (12) || 43,517 || 41-34
|- align="center" bgcolor="bbffbb"
| 76 || June 23 || @ Braves || 4 – 1 || Sheets (9-1) || Reyes (3-5) || || 25,661 || 42-34
|- align="center" bgcolor="bbffbb"
| 77 || June 24 || @ Braves || 4 – 3 || Bush (4-7) || Morton (1-1) || Torres (13) || 29,224 ||43-34
|- align="center" bgcolor="ffbbbb"
| 78 || June 25 || @ Braves || 4 – 2  || Campillo (3-2) || Suppan (4-6) || González (2) || 34,829 || 43-35
|- align="center" bgcolor="ffbbbb"
| 79 || June 27 || @ Twins || 7 – 6 || Guerrier (4-2) || Mota (2-5) || Nathan (22) || 30,104 || 43-36
|- align="center" bgcolor="bbffbb"
| 80 || June 28 || @ Twins || 5 – 1 || Parra (8-2) || Hernández (8-5) ||  || 38,963 || 44-36
|- align="center" bgcolor="ffbbbb"
| 81 || June 29 || @ Twins || 5 – 0 || Slowey (5-6) || Sheets (9-2)|| || 30,655 || 44-37
|- align="center" bgcolor="ffbbbb"
| 82 || June 30 || @ D-backs || 6 – 3 || Davis (3-3) || Bush (4-8) || Lyon (17) || 23,040 || 44-38
|-

|- align="center" bgcolor="bbffbb"
| 83 || July 1 || @ D-backs || 8 – 6 || Suppan (5-6) || Johnson (4-7) || Torres (14) || 21,736 || 45-38
|- align="center" bgcolor="bbffbb"
| 84 || July 2 || @ D-backs || 4 – 3 || Riske (1-1) || Lyon (2-3) || Torres (15) || 22,324 || 46-38
|- align="center" bgcolor="ffbbbb"
| 85 || July 3 || @ D-backs || 6 – 5 || Rosales (1-0) || Torres (4-2) || || 23,842 || 46-39
|- align="center" bgcolor="bbffbb"
| 86 || July 4 || Pirates || 9 – 1 ||Sheets (10-2) || Gorzelanny (6-7)|| Villanueva (1) || 41,463 || 47-39
|- align="center" bgcolor="bbffbb"
| 87 || July 5 || Pirates || 2 – 1 ||Gagné (2-2) || Yates (3-2) || || 39,176 || 48-39
|- align="center" bgcolor="bbffbb"
| 88 || July 6 || Pirates || 11 – 6 || Stetter (2-1) || Bautista (1-2) || || 42,163 || 49-39
|- align="center" bgcolor="ffbbbb"
| 89 || July 7 || Rockies || 4 – 3 || Jiménez (4-8) || McClung (5-4) || Fuentes (14) || 35,161 || 49-40
|- align="center" bgcolor="bbffbb"
| 90 || July 8 || Rockies || 7 – 3 || Sabathia (7-8) || Redman (2-4) || || 42,533 || 50-40
|- align="center" bgcolor="ffbbbb"
| 91 || July 9 || Rockies || 8 – 3 || Rusch (2-3) || Sheets (10-3) || || 37,092 || 50-41
|- align="center" bgcolor="bbffbb"
| 92 || July 10 || Rockies || 11 – 1 || Bush (5-8) || de la Rosa (3-5) || || 43,389 || 51-41
|- align="center" bgcolor="ffbbbb"
| 93 || July 11 || Reds || 6-5 || Lincoln (1-2) || Shouse (3-1) || Cordero (19) || 41,229 || 51-42
|- align="center" bgcolor="ffbbbb"
| 94 || July 12 || Reds || 8-2 || Vólquez (12-3) || McClung (5-5) || || 43,556 || 51-43
|- align="center" bgcolor="bbffbb"
| 95 || July 13 || Reds || 3-2 || Sabathia (8-8) || Weathers (2-5) || || 42,108 || 52-43
|- align="center" bgcolor="bbffbb"
| 96 || July 18 || @ Giants || 9-1 || Sabathia (9-8) || Cain (5-8) || || 40,882 || 53-43
|- align="center" bgcolor="bbffbb" 
| 97 || July 19 || @ Giants || 8-5 || Villanueva (4-5) || Matos (0-2) || Torres (16) || 36,852 || 54-43 
|- align="center" bgcolor="bbffbb"
| 98 || July 20 || @ Giants || 7-4 || Parra (9-2) || Lincecum (11-3) || Torres (17) || 37,507 || 55-43
|- align="center" bgcolor="bbffbb"
| 99 || July 21 || @ Cardinals || 6-3 || Torres (5-2) || Franklin (3-3) || || 41,006 || 56-43
|- align="center" bgcolor="bbffbb"
| 100 || July 22 || @ Cardinals || 4-3 || Shouse (4-1) || McClellan(2-5) || Torres (18) || 41,955 || 57-43
|- align="center" bgcolor="bbffbb"
| 101 || July 23 || @ Cardinals || 3-0 || Sabathia (10-8) || Looper (9-8) || || 41,513 || 58-43
|- align="center" bgcolor="bbffbb"
| 102 || July 24 || @ Cardinals || 4-3 || Gagné (3-2) || Franklin(3-4) || Torres (19) || 41,233 || 59-43
|- align="center" bgcolor="ffbbbb"
| 103 || July 25 || Astros || 3-1 || Rodríguez (6-3) || Parra (9-3) || Valverde (26) || 41,357 || 59-44
|- align="center" bgcolor="bbffbb"
| 104 || July 26 || Astros || 6-4 || Gagné (4-2) || Brocail (4-5) || Torres (20) || 43,489 || 60-44
|- align="center" bgcolor="ffbbbb"
| 105 || July 27 || Astros || 11-6 || Sampson (5-3) || Suppan (5-7) || || 41,565 || 60-45
|- align="center" bgcolor="ffbbbb"
| 106 || July 28 || Cubs || 6-4 || Gaudin || Torres (5-3) || Mármol (5) || 45,311 || 60-46
|- align="center" bgcolor="ffbbbb"
| 107 || July 29 || Cubs || 7-1 || Zambrano (12-4) || Sheets (10-4) || || 45,069 || 60-47
|- align="center" bgcolor="ffbbbb"
| 108 || July 30 || Cubs || 7-2 || Dempster (12-4) || Parra (9-4) || || 44,871 || 60-48
|- align="center" bgcolor="ffbbbb"
| 109 || July 31 || Cubs || 11-4 || Harden (1-1) || Bush (5-9) || || 45,346 || 60-49
|-

|- align="center" bgcolor="bbffbb"
| 110 || August 1 || @ Braves || 9-0 || Suppan (6-7) || James || || 32,238 || 61-49
|- align="center" bgcolor="bbffbb"
| 111 || August 2 || @ Braves || 4-2 || Sabathia (5-0) || Morton (2-5) || Torres (21) || 42,096 || 62-49
|- align="center" bgcolor="ffbbbb"
| 112 || August 3 || @ Braves || 5-0 || Campillo (6-4) || Sheets (10-5) || || 21,997 || 62-50
|- align="center" bgcolor="ffbbbb"
| 113 || August 4 || @ Reds || 6-3 || Arroyo (10-8) || Parra (9-5) || Cordero (22) || 24,706 || 62-51
|- align="center" bgcolor="bbffbb"
| 114 || August 5 || @ Reds || 8-1 || Bush (6-9)|| Vólquez (13-5) || || 24,739 || 63-51
|- align="center" bgcolor="bbffbb"
| 115 || August 6 || @ Reds || 6-3 || Suppan (7-7) || Bailey (0-6) || Torres (22) || 26,602 || 64-51
|- align="center" bgcolor="bbffbb"
| 116 || August 8 || Nationals || 5-0 || Sabathia (6-0) || Balester (2-4) || || 43,209 || 65-51
|- align="center" bgcolor="bbffbb"
| 117 || August 9 || Nationals || 6-0 || Sheets (11-5) || Redding (8-7) || || 42,974 || 66-51
|- align="center" bgcolor="bbffbb"
| 118 || August 10 || Nationals || 5-4 || Mota (3-5) || Ayala (1-8) || || 42,423 || 67-51
|- align="center" bgcolor="bbffbb"
| 119 || August 11 || Nationals || 7-1 || Bush (7-9) || Mock (0-3) || || 42,196 || 68-51
|- align="center" bgcolor="bbffbb"
| 120 || August 12 || @ Padres || 5-2 || Suppan (8-7) || Baek (4-6) || Torres (23) || 28,373 || 69-51
|- align="center" bgcolor="bbffbb"
| 121 || August 13 || @ Padres || 7-1 || Sabathia (7-0) || Banks (3-5) || || 32,771 || 70-51
|- align="center" bgcolor="ffbbbb"
| 122 || August 14 || @ Padres || 3-2 || Peavy (9-8) || Sheets (11-6) || Hoffman (26) || 30,145 || 70-52
|- align="center" bgcolor="ffbbbb"
| 123 || August 15 || @ Dodgers || 5-3 || Billingsley (12-9) || Parra (9-6) || Broxton (9) || 44,547 || 70-53
|- align="center" bgcolor="bbffbb"
| 124 || August 16 || @ Dodgers || 4-3  (10) || Torres (6-3) || Broxton (3-4) || Riske (2) || 52,889 || 71-53
|- align="center" bgcolor="ffbbbb"
| 125 || August 17 || @ Dodgers || 7-5 || Beimel (4-0) || Villanueva (4-6) || || 45,267 || 71-54
|- align="center" bgcolor="bbffbb"
| 126 || August 18 || Astros || 9-3 || Sabathia (8-0) || Wolf (8-11) || || 41,991 || 72-54
|- align="center" bgcolor="ffbbbb"
| 127 || August 19 || Astros || 5-2 || Moehler (9-4) || Sheets (11-7) || Valverde (32) || 41,622 || 72-55
|- align="center" bgcolor="bbffbb"
| 128 || August 20 || Astros || 5-2 || Parra (10-6) || Rodríguez (7-6) || Torres (24) || 41,419 || 73-55
|- align="center" bgcolor="bbffbb"
| 129 || August 22 || Pirates || 10-4 || Bush (8-9) || Duke (4-12) || || 41,637 || 74-55
|- align="center" bgcolor="bbffbb"
| 130 || August 23 || Pirates || 6-3 || Suppan (9-7) || Gorzelanny (6-8) || Torres (25) || 43,293 || 75-55
|- align="center" bgcolor="bbffbb"
| 131 || August 24 || Pirates || 4-3  (12) || Mota (4-5) || Davis (1-4) || || 45,163 || 76-55
|- align="center" bgcolor="bbffbb"
| 132 || August 26 || @ Cardinals || 12-0 || Sheets (12-7) || Wellemeyer (11-5) || || 41,121 || 77-55
|- align="center" bgcolor="ffbbbb"
| 133 || August 27 || @ Cardinals || 5-3 || Franklin (5-5) || Riske (1-2) || Perez (6) || 41,433 || 77-56
|- align="center" bgcolor="bbffbb"
| 134 || August 29 || @ Pirates || 3-1 || Bush (9-9) || Gorzelanny (6-9) || Torres (26) || 18,086 || 78-56
|- align="center" bgcolor="bbffbb"
| 135 || August 30 || @ Pirates || 11-3 || Suppan (10-7) || Maholm (8-8) || || 21,931 || 79-56
|- align="center" bgcolor="bbffbb"
| 136 || August 31 || @ Pirates || 7-0 || Sabathia (9-0) || Karstens (2-4) || || 21,293 || 80-56
|-

|- align="center" bgcolor="ffbbbb"
| 137 || September 1 || Mets || 4-2 || Figueroa (3-3) || Gagné (4-3) || Ayala (4) || 41,476 || 80-57
|- align="center" bgcolor="ffbbbb"
| 138 || September 2 || Mets || 6-5  (10) || Smith (3-3) || Torres (6-4) || Ayala (5) || 36,587 || 80-58
|- align="center" bgcolor="ffbbbb"
| 139 || September 3 || Mets || 9-2 || Pérez (10-7) || Bush (9-10) || || 26,236 || 80-59
|- align="center" bgcolor="ffbbbb"
| 140 || September 4 || Padres || 5-2 || Estes (2-1) || Suppan (10-8) || Hoffman (28) || 33,182 || 80-60
|- align="center" bgcolor="bbffbb"
| 141 || September 5 || Padres || 3-2  (11) || Shouse (5-1) || Falkenborg (2-3) || || 41,519 || 81-60
|- align="center" bgcolor="bbffbb"
| 142 || September 6 || Padres || 1-0 || Sheets (13-7) || Peavy (9-10) || || 42,667 || 82-60
|- align="center" bgcolor="ffbbbb"
| 143 || September 7 || Padres || 10-1 || Young (5-5) || Parra (10-7) || || 44,568 || 82-61
|- align="center" bgcolor="ffbbbb"
| 144 || September 8 || Reds || 5-4 || Burton (5-1) || Torres (6-5) || Cordero (28) || 30,867 || 82-62
|- align="center" bgcolor="ffbbbb"
| 145 || September 9 || Reds || 5-4  (11) || Adkins (1-0) || McClung (5-6) || Cordero (29) || 30,312 || 82-63
|- align="center" bgcolor="bbffbb"
| 146 || September 10 || Reds || 4-3 || Mota (5-5) || Weathers (2-6) || Torres (27) || 30,124 || 83-63
|- align="center" bgcolor="ffbbbb"
| 147 || September 11 || @ Phillies || 6-3 || Moyer (14-7) || Sheets (13-8) || Lidge (36) || 39,994 || 83-64
|- align="center" bgcolor="ffbbbb"
| 148 || September 13 || @ Phillies || 7-3 || Hamels (13-9) || Parra (10-8) || || 45,105 || 83-65
|- align="center" bgcolor="ffbbbb"
| 149 || September 14 || @ Phillies || 7-3 || Eyre (4-0) || Mota (5-6) || || 43,950 || 83-66
|- align="center" bgcolor="ffbbbb"
| 150 || September 14 || @ Phillies || 6-1 || Myers (10-11) || Suppan (10-9) || || 39,776 || 83-67
|- align="center" bgcolor="ffbbbb"
| 151 || September 16 || @ Cubs || 5-4 || Dempster (16-6) || Sabathia (9-1) || Wood (31) || 40,738 || 83-68
|- align="center" bgcolor="bbffbb"
| 152 || September 17 || @ Cubs || 6-2 || DiFelice (1-0) || Marquis (10-9) || || 41,200 || 84-68
|- align="center" bgcolor="ffbbbb"
| 153 || September 18 || @ Cubs || 7-6  (12) || Wood (5-4) || Villanueva (4-7) || || 40,678 || 84-69
|- align="center" bgcolor="ffbbbb"
| 154 || September 19 || @ Reds || 11-2 || Ramírez (1-0) || Suppan (10-10) || || 20,855 || 84-70
|- align="center" bgcolor="ffbbbb"
| 155 || September 20 || @ Reds || 4-3 || Cueto (9-13) || Sabathia (9-2) || Cordero (32) || 24,440 || 84-71
|- align="center" bgcolor="bbffbb"
| 156 || September 21 || @ Reds || 8-1 || Coffey (1-0) || Arroyo (15-11) || || 22,624 || 85-71
|- align="center" bgcolor="bbffbb"
| 157 || September 23 || Pirates || 7-5 || Torres (7-5) || Beam (2-2) || || 36,612 || 86-71
|- align="center" bgcolor="bbffbb"
| 158 || September 24 || Pirates || 4-2 || Sabathia (10-2) || Maholm (9-9) || Torres (28) || 31,164 || 87-71
|- align="center" bgcolor="bbffbb"
| 159 || September 25 || Pirates || 5-1 (10) || Stetter (3-1) || Chavez (0-1) ||  || 40,102 || 88-71
|- align="center" bgcolor="bbffbb"
| 160 || September 26 || Cubs || 5-1 || McClung (6-6) || Marshall (3-5) ||  || 44,084 || 89-71
|- align="center" bgcolor="ffbbbb"
| 161 || September 27 || Cubs || 7-3 || Lilly (17-9) || Sheets (13-9) ||  || 45,288 || 89-72
|- align="center" bgcolor="bbffbb"
| 162 || September 28 || Cubs || 3-1 || Sabathia (11-2) || Howry (7-5) ||  || 45,299 || 90-72
|-

Postseason
For the first time in 26 years (since 1982) the Brewers reached the playoffs.

They lost 3 games to 1 to the Philadelphia Phillies in the NLDS.

|- align="center" bgcolor="ffbbbb"
| 1 || October 1 || @ Philadelphia Phillies || 1-3 || Hamels || Gallardo || Lidge || 45,929 || 0-1 ||
|- align="center" bgcolor="ffbbbb"
| 2 || October 2 || @ Philadelphia Phillies || 2-5 || Myers || Sabathia || Lidge || 46,208 || 0-2 ||
|- align="center" bgcolor="bbffbb"
| 3 || October 4 || Philadelphia Phillies || 4-1 || Bush || Moyer || Torres || 43,992 || 1-2 ||
|- align="center" bgcolor="ffbbbb"
| 4 || October 5 || Philadelphia Phillies || 2-6 || Blanton || Suppan || - || 43,934 || 1-3 ||

Farm system

The Brewers' farm system consisted of six minor league affiliates in 2008.

References

Game Logs:
1st Half: Milwaukee Brewers Game Log on ESPN.com
2nd Half: Milwaukee Brewers Game Log on ESPN.com
Batting Statistics: Milwaukee Brewers Batting Stats on ESPN.com
Pitching Statistics: Milwaukee Brewers Pitching Stats on ESPN.com
2008 Milwaukee Brewers at Baseball Reference

Milwaukee Brewers seasons
Milwaukee Brewers season
Milwaukee Brew